Valeri Losev (born 28 February 1956 in Tashkömür, Kyrgyz SSR) is a Kyrgyzstani former volleyball player who competed for the Soviet Union in the 1988 Summer Olympics.

In 1988 he was part of the Soviet team which won the silver medal in the Olympic tournament. He played all seven matches.

External links
 profile

1956 births
Living people
Soviet men's volleyball players
Russian men's volleyball players
Kyrgyzstani men's volleyball players
Olympic volleyball players of the Soviet Union
Volleyball players at the 1988 Summer Olympics
Olympic silver medalists for the Soviet Union
Olympic medalists in volleyball
People from Jalal-Abad Region
Kyrgyzstani people of Russian descent
Medalists at the 1988 Summer Olympics